The 1977–78 Liga Bet season saw Hapoel Kiryat Ata, Hapoel Givat Olga, Hapoel Kafr Qasim and Maccabi Kiryat Gat win their regional divisions and promoted to Liga Alef.

Second placed clubs, Maccabi Ahi Nazareth, Hapoel Givat Haim, Maccabi Lazarus Holon and Hapoel Dimona were also promoted, as both Liga Leumit and Liga Artzit were expanded to 16 clubs in each league.

North Division A

North Division B

South Division A

South Division B

References
Negative goal difference sealed Mahane Yehuda's fate Maariv, 28.5.78, Historical Jewish Press 

Liga Bet seasons
Israel
4